Tonna sulcosa, common name banded tun, is a species of large sea snail, a marine gastropod mollusk in the family Tonnidae, the tun shells.

Description

These medium-sized shells are quite strong, oval-globose, with 4 -5 moderately convex turns and flat ridges. The aperture is large, semi-circular, with reflected lip and long, sharp teeth.

The shell surface is white with 3 - 5 wide brown bands.

Thin shell is ovate and ventricose. Its ground color is whitish, with four or five distinct bands of a reddish fawn-color, rarely continued to the outer lip. There is only one upon the two whorls next above the lowest. The spire is brown at top, and is formed of six convex whorls, encircled by projecting, pretty narrow, equal, approximate, flattened ribs, a little more distant towards the upper part..They are separated by shallow furrows. Two of the upper whorls are chequered as it were by intersections of striae. The suture is a little flattened, and slightly channeled. The ovate aperture is white, colored with red at the bottom. The outer lip is arcuated, and presents externally a projecting margin, which is crenulated outwardly by the jutting of the ribs, undulated externally, and dentated within. The columella is twisted. And upon some specimens are observed several crenulations towards the base of the inner lip which partially covers the umbilicus. The periostracum is thin and reddish.<ref name="Kiener">Kiener (1840). General species and iconography of recent shells : comprising the Massena Museum, the collection of Lamarck, the collection of the Museum of Natural History, and the recent discoveries of travellers; Boston :W.D. Ticknor,1837 (described as  'Dolium fasciatum)</ref>

Distribution
This species is widespread in the tropical Indo-West Pacific region - from the Red Sea and the Indian Ocean to the Indo-China, the Philippines and Australia (Queensland and Western Australia).Ramsay, E. P. Distribution at Biodiversity Library - Records of the Australian MuseumSealife Base

Habitat
These benthic gastropods live on sandy bottoms in tropical environment at depths of 10 to 70 m.

Life cycle
Embryos develop into free-swimming planktonic marine larvae (trocophore) and later into juvenile veligers.

Bibliography
 Vos, C. (2007) A conchological Iconography (No. 13) - The family Tonnidae. 123 pp.,
 G. T. Poppe - Philippine Marine Molluscs Vol. 1, p 106
 Alan G. Hinton - Shells of New Guinea & Central Pacific
 R. Tucker Abbott - Seashells of South East Asia
 Cornelis Swennen  and Robert Moolenbeek - The Molluscs of the southern Gulf of Thailand
 B. Dharma - Indonesian Shells I
 Hedley, C. 1919. A review of the Australian Tun Shells. Records of the Australian Museum 12(11): 329-336, pls 39-44
 Hinton, A.G. 1978. Guide to Australian Shells. Port Moresby : Robert Brown & Associates 82 pp. 
 Wilson, B. 1993. Australian Marine Shells. Prosobranch Gastropods. Kallaroo, Western Australia : Odyssey Publishing Vol. 1 408 pp.
 Wilson, B. 2002. A handbook to Australian seashells on seashores east to west and north to south. Sydney : Reed New Holland 185 pp.

References

 Martini, F.H.W. 1777. Neues systematisches Conchylien-Cabinet, fortgesetzt durch Johann Heironymus Chemnitz. Nürnberg : G. N. Raspe Vol. 3 vi + 1-434, pls 66-121.
 Born, I. von 1778. Index rerum naturalium Musei Caesarei Vindobonensis, pl. 1, Testacea. - Verzeichniss etc. Illust. Vindobonae. Vienna : J.P. Krauss xlii 458 pp. 
 Röding, P.F. 1798. Museum Boltenianum sive Catalogus cimeliorum e tribus regnis naturae quae olim collegerat Joa. Hamburg : Trappii 199 pp.
 Preston, H.B. 1910. Description of new shells in the collection of the Indian Museum from Burma, Siam and the Bay of Bengal.'' Records of the Indian Museum 5(5): 34-35

External links
 NCBI
 Encyclopedia of life
 Bold Systems
 Gastropods.com: Tonna (Sulcosa complex) sulcosa

Tonnidae
Gastropods described in 1778